Smoke signals are a form of visual communication used over long distances.

Smoke Signal(s) may also refer to:

Film and TV
 Smoke Signal (film), a 1955 American film
 "Smoke Signals", an episode of 2022 TV series American Horror Story: NYC
 "Smoke Signals" (Dexter: New Blood), a 2021 episode of the TV series Dexter: New Blood
 Smoke Signals (film), a 1998 Canadian-American film
 "Smoke Signals" (American Horror Story), an episode of the eleventh season of American Horror Story

Music
 Smoke Signals (Smokey Robinson album), 1986 
 Smoke Signals (MDC album), 1986
 Smoke Signals (song), a 1956 song by Slim Whitman
 "Smoke Signals", a song by Extreme on the 1989 album Extreme
 "Smoke Signals", a song by Phoebe Bridgers on the 2017 album Stranger in the Alps

Publications
 Smoke Signal (newsletter), 1975 publication produced by Bill Rosser and others on Palm Island, Australia
 Smoke Signals (journal), the official magazine of the Aboriginal Advancement League in Victoria, Australia
 Smoke Signals (newspaper), published by the Confederated Tribes of Grand Ronde, Oregon, U.S.

Other uses
 Smoke Signal, Arizona, a community in the United States
 Smoke Signal Broadcasting, a defunct American computer company